The 2021 Houston Outlaws season was the Houston Outlaws's fourth season in the Overwatch League (OWL). Harsha Bandi, who served as the team's head coach in the 2020 season, and Choi "Junkbuck" Jaewon served as the team's co-head coaches. The Outlaws underwent major roster changes in the offseason, with six of their eight players from 2020 leaving the team. The Outlaws failed to qualify for any of the four midseason tournaments. Houston finished the regular season with an 11–5 record and a fifth-place finish in the Western region. The Outlaws qualified for the West play-in tournament; however, they lost to the Washington Justice in the play-ins and did not qualify for the season playoffs for the fourth consecutive season.

Preceding offseason

Organizational changes 
In October 2020, assistant coach Chris "Dream" Myrick left the organization. Additionally, the Outlaws signed former San Francisco Shock assistant coach Jae "Junkbuck" Choi to be a co-head coach along with their current head coach Harsha Bandi and promoted Matt "coolmatt" Iorio as the organization's new general manager.

Roster changes 

The Outlaws entered free agency with eight free agents, seven of which became free agents due to the Outlaws not exercising the option to retain the player for another year.

Acquisitions 
The Outlaws' first offseason acquisition was William "Crimzo" Hernandez, a support player coming off a season with the Dallas Fuel placing in the top three among all Overwatch League flex supports in healing, damage, and eliminations per 10 minutes, who was signed on November 24, 2020. The next day, they signed Lee "Happy" Jung-woo, a damage player and sniper specialist who played with the Guangzhou Charge for two seasons. Houston signed two rookie tank players on December 4, Shin "PIGGY" Min-jun and Cho "JJANGGU" Myung-heum, both of whom played for Talon Esports in Overwatch Contenders the previous season. Three days later, they acquired damage player Kyle "KSF" Frandanisa from the Los Angeles Valiant. The Outlaws' next acquisition was on December 11; the Outlaws signed support player Enrique "Joobi" Triana, who had been playing for Harrisburg University Storm. The signing marked the first time that a college player had been signed directly to an Overwatch League roster. Houston's final signing of the offseason was on January 21, 2021, with the signing of damage player Jacob "Jake" Lyon, a former member of the Outlaws who retired to pursue a career in casting prior in the 2020 season.

Departures 
Seven of the Outlaws' eight free agents did not return, four of which signing with other teams, beginning with support player Kim "Rapel" Jun-keun signing with the Dallas Fuel on October 27, 2020. On November 10, support player Lee "Jecse" Seung-soo also signed with the Fuel. The team lost damage player Jiri "Linkzr" Masalin, who signed with the Vancouver Titans on December 1. Several weeks later, on December 26, damage player Jeffrey "Blasé" Tsang signed with the London Spitfire. Three of the Outlaws' free agents, tank player Kim "Meko" Tae-hong, tank player Austin "Muma" Wilmot, and support player Daniel "Boink" Pence did not sign with a team in the offseason.

Regular season 
The Outlaws began their 2021 season on April 16 in the May Melee qualifiers, playing against in-state rival Dallas Fuel in the May Melee qualifiers. After trading wins throughout the first four maps, the Outlaws won the match after taking map five. They won their next game against the defending OWL champions San Francisco Shock in a six-map series, thanks in part to a game-winning Earthshatter, Reinhardt ultimate ability, by Myung-heum "Jjanggu" Cho to close out the series. The following week, the Outlaws faced the Paris Eternal and London Spitfire; Houston defeated both teams to finish the qualifiers with a 4–0 record. With a first-round bye, the team advanced to the finals of the regional knockouts. Facing the Fuel in the regional finals, the Outlaws were swept 0–3, ending their May Melee run.

Lacking depth in tank players, the Outlaws signed Song "Dreamer" Sanglok, a tank player who had played for the Los Angeles Valiant in the 2020 season, prior to the beginning of the June Joust qualifiers. In the following tournament cycle, the June Joust, the Outlaws finished with a 3–1 record in the qualifiers and the advanced to the regional knockouts. For the third time in the season, and the second in a regional knockout, Houston faced the Fuel in the semifinals of the regional knockouts; they were swept 0–3 and eliminated from contention.

Prior to the beginning of the Summer Showdown, the third tournament cycle of the season, the Outlaws released veteran damage player João Pedro "Hydration" Goes Telles. Houston failed to advance to the regional knockouts of the Summer Showdown after losing to the Fuel in the final qualifying match of the tournament cycle. The Outlaws found similar results in the final tournament cycle, the Countdown Cup, as they were unable to make it past the qualifiers.

With an 11–5 regular season record and 11 league points, the Outlaws finished the season in fifth place in the West region standings, qualifying them to advance directly to the finals of the West region play-in tournament. Houston faced the Washington Justice in the finals. In the first-to-three series, the match was tied 2–2 after four maps; however, the Outlaws lost the final map and were eliminated from postseason contention.

Final roster

Transactions 
Transactions of/for players on the roster during the 2021 regular season:
On May 19, the Outlaws signed tank player Song "Dreamer" Sanglok.
On June 28, the Outlaws released damage player João Pedro "Hydration" Goes Telles.

Standings

Game log

Regular season 

|2021 season schedule

Postseason

References 

Houston Outlaws
Houston Outlaws
Houston Outlaws seasons